Chư Păh is a rural district of Gia Lai province in the Central Highlands region of Vietnam. As of 2003 the district had a population of 62,672. The district covers an area of 981 km2. The district capital lies at Phú Hòa.

References

Districts of Gia Lai province